Amrit Patel (born 14 July 1925) is an Indian politician. He was elected to the Lok Sabha, the lower house of the Parliament of India from Gandhinagar, Gujarat as a member of the Indian National Congress.

References

External links
Official biographical sketch in Parliament of India website

1925 births
Possibly living people
Lok Sabha members from Gujarat
India MPs 1980–1984
Indian National Congress politicians from Gujarat